Slovakia first participated at the World Games at the 1993 World Games and since then participated in all World Games.

Medal count

Medals by sport

List of medalists

See also
 Slovakia at the Youth Olympics
 Slovakia at the Olympics
 Slovakia at the Paralympics
 Slovakia at the European Youth Olympic Festival
 Slovakia at the European Games
 Slovakia at the Universiade

References
 World Games

Sport in Slovakia
Nations at the World Games
Slovakia at multi-sport events